The Flushing and North Side Railroad was a former railroad on Long Island built by Conrad Poppenhusen as a replacement for the former New York and Flushing Railroad. The railroad was established in 1868, was merged with the Central Railroad of Long Island in 1874 to form the Flushing, North Shore and Central Railroad, and was finally acquired by the Long Island Rail Road in 1876. Today the main line is known as the Port Washington Branch of the Long Island Rail Road.

Predecessor railroads

New York and Flushing Railroad 
Before the Flushing and North Side, most of the line was originally built by the New York and Flushing Railroad (NY&F), in 1854 from Hunters Point in Long Island City to Flushing, before the LIRR opened its line to Long Island City. Chartered on March 3, 1852, it was the first railroad on Long Island not to be part of the Long Island Rail Road. The company was taken over by Oliver Charlick and reorganized in 1859 as the New York and Flushing Railroad, and established a subsidiary known as the "North Shore Railroad" to extend the line from Flushing to Great Neck in 1866 (see below). Originally intending to run further east to Roslyn, Oyster Bay, and even Huntington, the NY&F's plans were thwarted by the LIRR who reached those destination first, as well as poor service that the company became known for.

Flushing and Woodside Railroad 
Dissatisfied with the NY&F's service, residents of Flushing and Newtown convinced the LIRR to incorporate the Flushing and Woodside Railroad on February 24, 1864 as a competing branch to Flushing. The branch ran from Woodside toward Great Neck Junction, with a branch to Whitestone. When the NY&F collapsed after construction of the Great Neck Extension, the LIRR acquired the railroad and left this branch unfinished. After Poppenhausen created the Flushing and North Side Railroad, he also acquired the Flushing and Woodside, but was able to complete construction of the line, which became the Woodside Branch of the Flushing and North Side. The line only contained one other station at Junction Boulevard and 35th Avenue called Grinnell station. This station opened on April 24, 1874 and closed in October 1877. East of Grinnell station and the Flushing River, there was a junction leading either toward the main line of the F&NS railroad or the Whitestone Branch.

North Shore Railroad
Despite service complaints, New York and Flushing established a subsidiary called the North Shore Railroad of Long Island on September 25, 1863 to extend the line from Flushing to Great Neck. The extension opened on October 27, 1866. Unfortunately, the NY&F realized that they could not survive the competition, and sold their line (and their lease on the North Shore Railroad of Long Island.) to the LIRR in 1867. The LIRR benefitted by preventing the South Side Railroad from using the New York and Flushing access to the LIRR's Long Island City terminal, and by keeping the North Side Railroad from extending east to Huntington in competition with the LIRR. The LIRR also stopped construction on the incomplete Flushing and Woodside.

Formation

Flushing citizens, feeling they had been tricked into building the Flushing and Woodside in order to scare the Flushing and North Side into selling out to the LIRR, convinced wealthy residents of College Point and Whitestone, including Conrad Poppenhusen, to incorporate the Flushing and North Side Railroad on April 3, 1868. This company had the right to build a line from Long Island City to Flushing and beyond to Roslyn, with a branch from Flushing to Whitestone. The group gained control of the unfinished Flushing and Woodside Railroad, and opened its line to Flushing, paralleling the LIRR from Long Island City to Woodside, in 1868 and to College Point and Whitestone in 1869. This new line attracted most of the traffic from the older New York and Flushing, and the LIRR wanted to get rid of its Flushing branch. 

In 1869, an affiliate of the Flushing and North Side, the Whitestone and Westchester Railroad, built the Whitestone Branch. It was intended to cross the East River to Westchester County, but never had the chance to do so. The line had a spur to a freight dock on Flushing Bay which crossed the Woodside Branch and the connecting line between the Woodside and Whitestone Branches. After the Flushing Bay Freight spur, the line itself also crossed the Woodside Branch, and then merged with the Woodside-Whitestone connector before crossing the Flushing River. From there it contained four stations, one at Bridge Street, College Point, and two in Whitestone, one at 14th Avenue and the other at 155th Street, which has been called Whitestone Landing station, and Beechhurst Yacht Club station. Malba station was not built until decades after the line was acquired by the LIRR.

In 1869, the New York State Legislature authorized the Flushing and North Side to buy the New York and Flushing east of the LIRR crossing at  connections were built by the Flushing and North Side at Woodside/Winfield and Flushing to connect its lines. The New York and Flushing continued to own the line west of Winfield, and soon became the South Side Railroad's access to Long Island City. 

The segment between what was to become the former  and  stations was abandoned for passenger service in 1875, and completely abandoned in 1880. Part of the right-of-way ran through what is today the Mount Zion Jewish Cemetery in Maspeth. The Flushing and Woodside was merged into the Flushing and North Side in 1871, and its line was abandoned in favor of the ex-New York and Flushing line.

Proposed expansion
Since both the NY&F and F&NS planned to expand service east of Great Neck, subsidiaries of the railroad were created for this purpose. In the case of the F&NS, two proposed railroads included the North Shore and Port Washington Railroad and the Roslyn and Huntington Railroad. Neither of these proposals were carried out. In fact, they were eliminated during the merger with the Central Railroad of Long Island in 1874 (see below), although the LIRR did try to extend the line to Roslyn until 1882 due to the difficulty of construction around the Manhasset Valley.

Mergers
On June 19, 1874, all branches of the Flushing and North Side Railroad, including the Main Line to Great Neck were incorporated into the Flushing, North Shore and Central Railroad, which included the Central Railroad of Long Island. Two years later, it would become part of the Long Island Rail Road. This required the construction of the Manhasset Viaduct over Manhasset Bay, which was completed on June 23, 1898. The Woodside and Whitestone Branches were abandoned.

Station listing

Main Line

Original New York & Flushing section

Woodside Branch

Whitestone Branch

References

External links

MTA Long Island Rail Road
Bob Andersen's Unofficial LIRR History Website:
Port Washington Branch Stations
Whitestone Branch
NYCSubway.org: Port Washington Branch
Forgotten New York:
Pride in Port (The Jekyll & Hyde Branch of the Long Island Railroad: Part One)
Pride in Port (The Jekyll & Hyde Branch of the Long Island Railroad: Part Two)
Like a Rolling Whitestone
Whitestone Branch Part One, Part Two, Part Three, Part Four, and Part Five (Arrt's Arrchives)
The Third Rail; LIRR History Part 1(Page 10)

Defunct New York (state) railroads
Predecessors of the Long Island Rail Road
Defunct public transport operators in the United States
Railroads on Long Island

Railway companies established in 1868
Railway companies disestablished in 1876
American companies disestablished in 1876
American companies established in 1868